The Exil-CDU (Christian Democratic Union in Exile) was from 1950 to 1990 a national federation of the CDU. It represented CDU members who had escaped or expelled from the Soviet occupation zone or GDR.

Background 

From the outset, the work of the democratic parties in the Soviet occupation zone was severely hampered. Already 1945, the elected chairman of the East CDU Andreas Hermes was deposed by the occupation authorities. The attempts of the last freely elected chairman of the East CDU Jakob Kaiser, for the party political freedoms to preserve were however not successful. With the dismissal of the democratically elected party chair on 20 December 1947, the CDU's ability to determine its own positions ended. Earlier, Kaiser had a look at the Second Congress of the CDU in Berlin on September 6, 1947, in which Kaiser demanded that the CDU must be a "wavebreaker of dogmatic Marxism and its totalitarian tendencies."

Foundation of the Exil-CDU 

Since free party work in the Soviet Zone was no longer possible after the CDU had been joined, the Exil-CDU was formed. Alone of the 14 of the members of the SBZ-CDU's Democratic Party, democratically elected at the last free party conference on September 7, 1947, had gone ten to the West. These invited the delegates of the Second Congress of 1947 to the First Congress of the Exil-CDU on 24 and 25 September 1950 in West Berlin. Over 200 emigrated Christian Democrats from the GDR participated. Kaiser and Lemmer were confirmed in their board offices.

Since, after 20 December 1947, the statutory free elections in the East were no longer possible, the CDU regarded the last freely elected executive committee as a legitimate representative of the Party in the East.

Organisation and work 

The Exil-CDU was treated as a national association by the federal party. It had eight representatives from the Federal Party Committee and delegates from the federal parliaments.

The operational work of the Exil-CDU was carried out by the East Bureau of the CDU. The General Secretariat of the Exil-CDU was formed.

It divided into 5 regional groups for the 5 länder of the GDR. Every 2 years, a congress of the Exil-CDU was held.

The number of members, which was nearly 90,000 in the early 1950s, steadily declined due to the fact that no new members were able to join, and ended with 6,000 members. The Exil-CDU held informal contacts with the Christian Democrats in the GDR (which was punishable as an illegal contact in the GDR). However, there were no official contacts with the East CDU.

The Exil-CDU existed until reunification.

Chairmen 

 Jakob Kaiser (1950-1961)
 Ernst Lemmer (1961-1970)
 Johann Baptist Gradl (1970-1987)
 Siegfried Lübel (1987-1990)

Literature 
 Hans-Otto Kleinmann: Geschichte der CDU 1945–1982, Stuttgart 1993, ; Pages 235–237, Page 480

Links 

 Exil-CDU On the website of the Konrad-Adenauer-Stiftung

Christian Democratic Union of Germany
Politics of East Germany
State sections of political parties in Germany
Exile
Political parties established in 1950
1990 disestablishments in Germany